Paula is a 1915 British silent drama film directed by Cecil Birch and starring Hetty Payne and Frank McClellan. It was made at the Holmfirth Studios in Yorkshire. The screenplay concerns a widow who follows her love to Italy, and dies after donating blood to save his life.

Cast
 Hetty Payne as Paula 
 Frank McClellan as Vincent Hallam

References

Bibliography
 Warren, Patricia. British Film Studios: An Illustrated History. Batsford, 2001.

External links

1915 films
1915 drama films
British drama films
British silent feature films
Films set in Italy
British black-and-white films
1910s English-language films
1910s British films
Silent drama films